Blepharomastix schistisemalis is a moth in the family Crambidae. It was described by George Hampson in 1912. It is found from Florida, to the Bahamas and Cuba through Central America (including Panama) to South America, south to Argentina.

References

Moths described in 1912
Blepharomastix